Rolando Pascua (born Rolando Tomongtong; November 19, 1965) is a Filipino former professional boxer. He held the WBC light-flyweight title from 1990 to 1991 and challenged for the IBF super-flyweight title in 1993.

Professional boxing career
Pascua debuted as a professional boxer on August 3, 1986, outpointing Eddie Dulay after four rounds in Pasay. Pascua built a record of 14 wins without a loss, with 3 wins by knockout, before facing 18 wins, 1 loss Jum Hwan Choi at Choi's hometown of Seoul, South Korea on January 28, 1988. Despite dropping the local in round six, Pascua lost a ten-round split decision to lose his condition as an undefeated fighter.

Pascua followed that first defeat with three wins in a row, over Triffon Torralba, Romy Austria and Jun Altarejos but then was surprisingly beaten by 0–1 Paul Badilla and by Rolando Protacio; these losses were both on points as Pascua lost to Badilla by ten round unanimous decision and to Protacio by eight rounds unanimous decision. Pascua then won two in a row, against Roger de Rama by ten round majority decision and Joseph Pacling by third-round technical knockout before facing world-ranked Rey Paciones, who was 22–2–3 (3 ties) with 5 knockouts coming into their bout. On August 19, 1989, Paciones defeated Pascua by ten rounds unanimous decision at Tagum City.

Pascua won 5 of his next six bouts, the exception being a loss by ten round unanimous decision at the hands of Napa Kiatwanchai, to become ranked by the WBC. He was matched to challenge WBC world champion Humberto Gonzalez on December 19, 1990, at the Great Western Forum in Inglewood, California, United States in what also constituted Pascua's first professional bout in the United States. Gonzalez was undefeated and untied in 30 bouts and was being considered for an unification super fight with the equally undefeated International Boxing Federation world champion Michael Carbajal, but Pascua, who only had 8 knockout wins among his 24 victories in 29 fights and was not considered a very hard puncher, caused an upset when he dethroned the world champion by a stirring, sixth-round knockout to win the WBC light-flyweight title.

For his first defense, Pascua returned to the Great Western Forum, this time to meet Melchor Cob Castro, who with 30 wins, 2 losses and 4 draws was challenging for a world title for the first time and beat Pascua by tenth-round technical knockout on March 25, 1991.

After losing to Cob Castro, Pascua's career followed a pattern of highs and lows. He won six in a row right after that defeat, but then was defeated by undefeated (26–0) Yoon-Un Jin on October 23, 1992, at Seoul. Pascua again recuperated by putting another modest winning streak, reaching three wins in a row, which included avenging his early loss to Rey Paciones by 12th-round technical knockout on February 20, 1993, to win the Philippine Games and Amusement Board's national super-flyweight title.

Pascua then challenged Chatchai Sasakul for the WBC's international flyweight title but lost by unanimous 12-round decision at Bangkok on April 28, 1993, but he followed that loss with a win over Dodie Boy Penalosa, a former world champion, by 10-round unanimous decision at the Cuneta Astrodome in Pasay on July 17.

After a fight in Japan in which Pascua defeated Hiroshi Kobayashi (an 8 wins, 8 losses and 1 tie boxer not to be confused with an earlier world champion boxer of the same name) by ten rounds unanimous decision on October 15, 1993, in Morioka, Pascua was once again ranked worldwide, this time by the IBF, and allowed to challenge for a world title, this time the IBF super-flyweight title which at the time was held by Mexican Julio Cesar Borboa, 20 wins and 4 losses coming into their fight. Pascua-Borboa, fought on November 26, 1993, at the Coliseo in Hermosillo, Mexico, was a war; Pascua almost became a two-time world champion when he dropped the Mexican boxer in round two but lost the fight when the champion dropped him and knocked him out in the fifth.

Pascua then lost 15 of his next 24 fights, including defeats at the hands of Samson Dutch Boy Gym, Gerry Penalosa (who thus avenged his brother Dodie's earlier loss to Pascua), Raffy Montalban in defense of Pascua's PGAB's national super-flyweight title, and Johnny Bredahl in a challenge for the minority recognized, International Boxing Organization bantamweight title (a first-round knockout loss) on March 29, 1996, at the Brondby Halle in Brondby, Denmark. Pascua was also defeated by Veerapol Sahaprom.

Pascua's final fight as a professional came against 7–2 Mapichit Utaiawee, a boxer Pascua had previously defeated, but on September 12, 1999, Utaiawee outpointed Pascua over twelve rounds, causing Pascua to retire afterward and never return to professional boxing.

Professional boxing record
Rolando Pascua compiled a record of 45 wins and 25 losses in 70 professional boxing fights, with 17 wins and 12 losses by knockout.

References

External links
 

1965 births
Living people
World light-flyweight boxing champions
Filipino male boxers
World Boxing Council champions